Mark Pope, Ed.D. (born April 23, 1952) is Thomas Jefferson Professor and Curators' Distinguished Professor Emeritus at the University of Missouri – Saint Louis (1997–2018), where he was a colleague to the social theorist Robert Rocco Cottone. Dr. Pope also served from (2006–2016) as chair of the Department of Counseling and Family Therapy at that university. He was president of the American Counseling Association (2003–2004), National Career Development Association (1998–1999), Association for Lesbian, Gay, Bisexual, and Transgender Issues in Counseling (1976–1978), and  Society for the Psychological Study of Lesbian, Gay, Bisexual, and Transgender Issues  (Division 44 of the American Psychological Association) (2011–2012), Sovereign Amonsoquth Tribe judge (2002-), and founder and first chair of the Professional Counseling Fund (2004–2006). Dr. Pope is widely considered to be one of the founders of and leading authors in the field of cultural diversity issues in career counseling and career development, especially gay and lesbian career development. His major publications have included writings in counseling with sexual minorities and international students, the history of and public policy issues in counseling, and professional identity.  He also served as editor of The Career Development Quarterly (2004–2008), the preeminent journal in career counseling and development.

Early life and education 
Pope was raised in Fisk, Missouri, a small town of less than 500 people in rural and agricultural southeast Missouri, in a family of teachers and preachers.  He  founded the student council at Fisk-Rombauer High School and was elected as its first president in 1968.  He was valedictorian of his graduating class and elected state vice-president of the Beta Clubs of Missouri; however, he was also quite well thought of by his classmates and was voted the "most talented" and "most likely to succeed" as well as class vice-president in his senior year. Between his junior and senior years in high school, he was selected to attend the National Science Foundation-funded Summer Institute in Mathematics and Science at the University of Kansas.
Dr. Pope attended the University of Missouri – Columbia (A.B., political science and sociology, 1973; M.Ed., counseling and personnel services, 1974) and the University of San Francisco (Ed.D., counseling and educational psychology, 1989). He was elected student body vice-president at the University of Missouri – Columbia in 1971 and president of the graduate student council at the University of San Francisco in 1986.

"Mark Pope, Ed.D., NCC, MCC, NCCC, RPCC, MAC, ACS has written extensively on careers, specifically on the career development of ethnic, racial, and sexual minorities in the US and around the world.  He describes himself as being raised as "a poor, gay, Cherokee boy in rural southeast Missouri."  From those important beginnings, he has risen to the highest positions in profession counseling in the US, including president of the American Counseling Association, National Career Development Association, Association for Lesbian, Gay, Bisexual, and Transgender Issues in Counseling, Society for the Psychological Study of Lesbian, Gay, Bisexual, and Transgender Issues (APA Division 44), and Professional Counseling Fund as well as editor of The Career Development Quarterly, the preeminent professional journal in career counseling and development.  He is also a committed internationalist and has written on the historical development of career counseling is the US, China, and Malaysia, and keynoted conferences in Australia, China, and the US."

Later life and Native American claims 
Pope is a founding member of the non-recognized  Sovereign Amonsoquth Tribe. Chief Walking Bear swore in Mark Raven Speaks Pope as a Southeastern District Cherokee Tribal Judge on April 7, 2002, in Eastwood, MO on the Amonsoquath Reservation. Isom Douglas "Hawkwatcher" Pope, his brother was present at this reservation formation meeting as a shaman. Dr. Pope and Isom Pope were founders of the St. Francis River Band of the Cherokee in the Fisk and Poplar Bluff area of Missouri where they were from. Isom Pope was a member of the National Native American Law Enforcement Assoc. "In August 2006, Pope was cited for possession of a small amount of marijuana and rolling papers while he was serving as the Iberia chief of police. He resigned immediately."

Counselor training and writing career 
Founding his high school student council and his other early achievements portended other firsts both inside and outside the counseling profession including founding the Missouri Student Lobby (now Associated Students of the University of Missouri), the third student lobby in the US; founding the first gay and lesbian peer counseling program in the US (part of Beckman House, the LGBT community center in Chicago); founding the Graduate Student Council at the University of San Francisco during his doctoral studies and serving as its first president; founding the first multicultural career counseling agency in the US (Career Decisions International, in San Francisco); founding the counseling services section of the American Indian AIDS Institute/Native American AIDS Project in San Francisco; being elected as the first openly gay president of the American Counseling Association; and founding the Professional Counseling Fund, the first federal political action committee for professional counselors.
Dr. Pope is author of numerous books, including Professional Counseling 101: Building a Strong Professional Identity, book chapters (45+), professional journal articles (50+), and over 150 international, national, regional, state, and local presentations.  His many presentations include keynote addresses in China, Australia, Canada, and the US as well as consultancies in Malaysia, Singapore, Hong Kong, and throughout the US with companies including Apple, Hewlett-Packard, Pacific Bell, the Internal Revenue Service.

His other major contribution has been to the literature on the training of counselors and includes seven books on teaching career counseling classes (Experiential Activities for Teaching Career Counseling Classes and for Facilitating Career Groups (3 volumes) and the Career Counseling Casebook (2 editions)); on teaching multicultural counseling classes (Experiential Activities for Teaching Multicultural Counseling Competence, 2010), on teaching classes on counseling sexual minorities (Casebook for Counseling Lesbian, Gay, Bisexual, and Transgender Persons and Their Families, 2012), and on teaching social justice and advocacy competence in counseling (Social Justice and Advocacy in Counseling: Experiential Activities for Teaching, 2020).  (See "Books" below.)

Dr. Pope is a fellow of several major professional societies including the American Counseling Association, American Psychological Association, National Career Development Association, Society of Counseling Psychology, Society for the Psychological Study of Culture, Ethnicity, and Race, and Society for the Psychology of Sexual Orientation and Gender Diversity.

Awards 
He has been the recipient of a number of major awards in the mental health professions including the human rights awards from the American Counseling Association and the state professional counseling associations of both California and Missouri, and culminating with receiving the Eminent Career Award of the National Career Development Association in 2008, the highest award in career counseling and development in the US.

In 2018, the Association for Lesbian, Gay, Bisexual, and Transgender Issues in Counseling (ALGBTIC) named an award in Dr. Pope's honor, the ALGBTIC Mark Pope Social Justice and Advocacy Award, for his lifetime of contributions in service of social justice and advocacy for the LGBT community.

In 2018, the University of Missouri System presented him with The Thomas Jefferson Award, the highest award that any faculty member may receive. Only one such award is given annually and faculty are nominated from all four campuses of that university system. In 2015 he was named a Curators' Distinguished Professor, only the 2nd such professorship awarded to a College of Education faculty member at the University of Missouri – St. Louis since the founding of that campus in 1953. Later, upon his retirement in 2018, he was named a Curators' Distinguished Professor Emeritus.

In 2004, Dr. Pope was selected for the OUT 100 as one of the major contributors to lesbian and gay culture in the US in that year   He received this recognition for being elected as the first openly gay person to serve as president of a major mental health professional association exactly 30 years after the removal of "homosexuality" from the list of psychiatric disorders in the US (Diagnostic and Statistical Manual of Mental Disorders, published by the American Psychiatric Association), repudiating once and for all the illness model used to limit the rights of gay, lesbian, and bisexual individuals in the US and around the world.

Pope was awarded the NOGLSTP LGBTQ+ Educator of the Year in 2012.

Books 
 Pope, M., Gonzalez, M., Cameron, E. R. N., & Pangelinan, J. S. (Eds.) (2020). Social justice and advocacy in counseling: Experiential activities for teaching. New York: Routledge/Taylor & Francis.
 Pope, M., Flores, L. Y., & Rottinghaus, P. J. (Eds.) (2014). The role of values in careers. Greensboro, NC: Information Age Publishing.</ref>
 Niles, S., Goodman, J., & Pope, M. (Eds.) (2014). The career counseling casebook: A resource for students, practitioners, and counselor educators (2nd ed.). Tulsa, OK: National Career Development Association. (266 pp.)
 Dworkin, S. H., & Pope, M. (Eds.) (2012). Casebook for counseling lesbian, gay, bisexual, and transgender persons and their families. Alexandria, VA: American Counseling Association.  (368 pp.)
 Lara, T., Pope, M., & Minor, C. W. (Eds.) (2011). Experiential activities for teaching career counseling classes and facilitating career groups (vol. 3). Broken Arrow, OK: National Career Development Association. (350 pp.)
 Pope, M., Pangelinan, J. S., & Coker, A. D. (Eds.). (2011). Experiential activities for teaching multicultural competence in counseling. Alexandria, VA: American Counseling Association. (342 pp.)
 Singaravelu, H., & Pope, M. (Eds.) (2007). Handbook for counseling international students in the United States. Alexandria, VA: American Counseling Association.  (329 pp.)
 Pope, M. (2006). Professional counseling 101: Building a strong professional identity. Alexandria, VA: American Counseling Association. (78 pp.)
 Minor, C. W., & Pope, M. (Eds.) (2005). Experiential activities for teaching career counseling classes and facilitating career groups (vol. 2). Tulsa, OK: National Career Development Association. (320 pp.)
 Niles, S., Goodman, J., & Pope, M. (Eds.) (2002). The career counseling casebook: A resource for students, practitioners, and counselor educators. Tulsa, OK: National Career Development Association. (266 pp.)
 Pope, M., & Minor, C. W. (Eds.) (2000). Experiential activities for teaching career counseling classes and facilitating career groups (vol. 1).  Columbus, OH: National Career Development Association.

References 

University of Missouri alumni
Career counselors
American relationships and sexuality writers
Living people
1952 births
People from St. Louis